Lucas Vinícius Gonçalves Silva (born 14 September 1991), commonly known as Lucão do Break or just Lucão, is Brazilian footballer who plays as a forward for V.League 1 club Hanoi FC.

Club career
Born in Brasília, Federal District, Lucão do Break started playing in Italy at the age of 15, but returned to Brazil after injuring his ankle. He subsequently finished his formation with Porto Alegre FC before joining Shonan Bellmare on 23 December 2010.

Lucão do Break made his senior debut on 29 June 2011, coming on as a second-half substitute for Daisuke Kikuchi in a 2–0 away loss against JEF United Chiba for the J2 League championship. His first goal came on 22 October, as he scored his team's seventh in a 7–1 home routing of FC Gifu.

On 25 February 2012, Lucão do Break was transferred to Segunda Liga side Portimonense. He contributed with 12 goalless appearances before playing in the 2012 U-20 Copa Libertadores on trial at Atlético Madrid.

Lucão do Break joined Sergipe ahead of the 2013 season, and finished the ensuing Campeonato Sergipano as the top goalscorer with ten goals as his side lifted the trophy. He subsequently represented Mogi Mirim, Caxias, another two stints at Sergipe, Resende and São Bento before moving abroad to FC Zimbru Chișinău in Moldova.

On 8 December 2016, eight days after being announced at CSE, Lucão joined Cruzeiro-RS. The following 8 May, he was presented at América de Natal in the Série D.

On 15 June 2017, Lucão do Break signed for Série B side Criciúma. He finished the season as the club's top goalscorer with ten goals.

On 20 December 2016, Lucão do Break agreed to a contract with fellow second division side Goiás, as his contract with Criciúma was due to expire.

In January 2019, Lucão do Break moved to Kuwait and signed with Kuwait SC for two years.

In August 2022, Lucão joined Hanoi FC for the remainder of the 2022 season.

Career statistics

Honours
Sergipe
Campeonato Sergipano: 2013, 2016

Hanoi FC
V.League 1: 2022 
Vietnamese National Cup: 2022
Vietnamese National Super Cup: 2022

References

External links

1991 births
Living people
Footballers from Brasília
Brazilian footballers
Association football forwards
Campeonato Brasileiro Série C players
Campeonato Brasileiro Série D players
Esporte Clube São Bento players
Sociedade Esportiva e Recreativa Caxias do Sul players
Mogi Mirim Esporte Clube players
Criciúma Esporte Clube players
Goiás Esporte Clube players
Club Sportivo Sergipe players
J2 League players
Shonan Bellmare players
Liga Portugal 2 players
Portimonense S.C. players
V.League 1 players
Hanoi FC players
Kuwait SC players
Kuwait Premier League players
Brazilian expatriate footballers
Brazilian expatriate sportspeople in Japan
Brazilian expatriate sportspeople in Portugal
Brazilian expatriate sportspeople in Bulgaria
Brazilian expatriate sportspeople in Kuwait
Brazilian expatriate sportspeople in Vietnam
Expatriate footballers in Japan
Expatriate footballers in Portugal
Expatriate footballers in Bulgaria
Expatriate footballers in Moldova
Expatriate footballers in Kuwait
Expatriate footballers in Vietnam